Jones Point may refer to:
 Jones Point, New York, a hamlet in Stony Point in Rockland County
 Jones Point (Antarctica), a point within Wilhelmina Bay
 Jones Point (Virginia), a point on the Potomac River